David H. Autor (born  1967) is an American economist, public policy scholar, and professor of economics at the Massachusetts Institute of Technology (MIT), where he also acts as co-director of the School Effectiveness and Inequality Initiative. Although Autor has contributed to a variety of fields in economics his research generally focuses on topics from labor economics.

Education and early life 

David Autor enrolled in Columbia University after high school, but dropped out and worked as an administrative assistant and software developer in a Boston hospital. He later returned to college, ultimately earning a B.A. in psychology from Tufts University in 1989. After graduating from Tufts, he pursued volunteer work with a Methodist church in San Francisco that was teaching computer skills to disadvantaged students. In the Bay Area, Autor discovered his passion for economics and public policy and pursued an M.A. and Ph.D. in public policy from the John F. Kennedy School of Government (Harvard University), which he earned in 1994 and 1999 respectively.

Academic career 

After completing his Ph.D. David Autor was hired as assistant professor at MIT's economics department, where he became the Pentti J.K. Kouri Career Development Assistant Professor of Economics in 2002 before being promoted to associate professor in 2003 and receiving tenure in 2005. He finally was made full professor at MIT in 2008 where he taught undergraduate courses titled "Microeconomic Theory and Public Policy" and "Putting Social Science to the Test: Experiments in Economics." In parallel to his position at MIT, Autor is or has been affiliated with several research institutions, including the National Bureau of Economic Research, the Poverty Action Lab, IZA and IZA World of Labor, is or has been the editor of economic academic journals such as the Journal of Economic Perspectives (2009–14), Journal of Labor Economics (2007–08), Journal of Economic Literature (2004–06) and the Review of Economics and Statistics (2002-2008). Finally, he is a co-director of the MIT School Effectiveness and Inequality Initiative (SEII), a research program focusing on the economics of education and the relationship between human capital and the American income distribution, as well as an associate director of the NBER Disability Research Center.

Research 

David Autor's research can be broadly categorized into five strands: (1) Inequality, technological change, and globalization; (2) disability and labor force participation; (3) labor market intermediation; (4) neighborhoods, housing market spillovers, and price controls; and (5) labor market impacts of wrongful discharge protections. The economics bibliographic database IDEAS/RePEc ranks him among the top 5% of economists under a number of criteria, including average rank score, number of works and number of citations. His most cited article, co-authored with Alan B. Krueger and Lawrence F. Katz, studies the effect of skill-biased technological change in the form of computerization on the diverging U.S. education wage differentials and finds evidence suggesting that computerization has increased skill-based wage premia in the U.S. by requiring rapid skill upgrading, which in turn has increased the labor demand for college graduates relative to workers without tertiary education as well as the wage premium associated with a college degree. In 2009 Autor contributed to the book "Studies of Labor Market Intermediation" as an editor during his time at the University of Chicago. He would later go on to write "The Work of the Future: Building Better Jobs in Age of Smart Machines" with his colleagues at MIT. In an influential 2013 study co-authored with David Dorn and Gordon H. Hanson, Autor showed that U.S. exposure to Chinese trade competition "caused higher unemployment, lower labor force participation, and reduced wages in local labor markets that house import-competing manufacturing industries". The study nonetheless finds that trade is a net gain for the population as a whole, and Autor has been an advocate for the Trans-Pacific Partnership as a means to protect U.S. workers. In 2020, Dr. Autor received the 25th Anniversary Special Recognition Heinz Award for his work and also received attention for his work with Elisabeth Reynolds on the adverse impacts of coronavirus disease 2019 on the office economy.

References

Sources 
 Curriculum Vitae of David Autor

Living people
Harvard Kennedy School alumni
Labor economists
Tufts University School of Arts and Sciences alumni
Fellows of the Econometric Society
Sloan Research Fellows
 MIT School of Humanities, Arts, and Social Sciences faculty
Fellows of the American Academy of Arts and Sciences
Year of birth missing (living people)
Place of birth missing (living people)
20th-century American economists
21st-century American economists
Urban Institute people